The 2023 Prague Lions season is the first season of the Prague Lions in the European League of Football for the 2023 season, after winning the Czech Bowl multiple years and the year prior.

Preseason
Coming prior from the Hungarian American Football League, the now franchise of the ELF re-signed with longterm head coach Zach Harrod. Also the president of the club, Michal Kozlíček, will serve as the president of the newly private organization. The Lions will keep an development team in the national league. Several players of the club team later signed contracts with the franchise for the 2023 season, starting with homegrown wide receiver Josef Janota.

Regular season

Standings

Roster

Staff

Notes

References 

Prague Lions
Prague Lions